Chippewas of Rama First Nation, also known as Chippewas of Mnjikaning and Chippewas of Rama Mnjikaning First Nation (also alternatively Rama Anishinaabek), is an Anishinaabe (Ojibway) First Nation located in the province of Ontario in Canada.  The name Mnjikaning, or fully vocalized as Minjikaning, refers to the fishing weirs at Atherley Narrows between Lake Simcoe and Lake Couchiching and it means "in/on/at or near the fence".

Rama is one of the Williams Treaties First Nations which consists of Rama, Beausoleil, Georgina Island, Scugog Island, Curve Lake, Hiawatha and Alderville, Together these Nations have a large Treaty area comprising Treaty 18, 16, 5, 20, 27, 27 1/4, Crawford Purchase and the Gunshot Treaty.

It was once known as Mnjikaning and Rama Mnjikaning but after a community referendum has since re-assumed the name of Chippewas of Rama First Nation. There are 1600 members with approximately 700 living on the reserve and about 900 living off the reserve.

The First Nation is adjacent to a 4,500-year-old wooden stake fishing weir system which at one time sustained many Native peoples but it is not clear who actually built this structure. Rama First Nation is geographically located within the Township of Ramara, but functions separately. Rama First Nation is also home to  Casino Rama and Entertainment Complex.

The people are descendants of the Chippewas of Lakes Huron and Simcoe (1800s) and were part of the Coldwater (1836) experiment before settling on the eastern shores of Lake Couchiching.  While the ancestors used clan markings/drawings for signatures, original family names were replaced with English names.  Many of the families currently living on and off the reserve include these original family names such as Benson, Ingersoll, Williams, Douglas, Shilling, Simcoe, Snache, St. Germain, Stinson, Yellowhead, Sandy, Sawyer, Anderson, Joe and York.  Some later name additions (mainly due to marriage) include  Comego, Cottrell, Cote, Desormeaux, Genno, Noganosh, Muir, Stiles, Watson, Graham, McPhee, McRae, Palmer and others.

History/Origins
Arriving to the area during the Great Anishinaabe migration, the Chippewas of Lakes Huron and Simcoe briefly migrated north during conflict with the Haudenosaunee during the Beaver Wars. Following resolution of the Beaver Wars and the creation of the Dish With One Spoon Wampum Belt, the Chippewas of Lakes Huron and Simcoe returned to Mnjikaning. The Chippewas of Lakes Huron and Simcoe occupied, at their greatest known extent, the lands surrounding Lake Simcoe and the Holland River watershed, extending westwards to encompass roughly present-day Simcoe County. Over a twenty-year span beginning in 1798, their leaders ceded the country west of the lake to the government of Upper Canada via three separate purchase agreements—the Penetanguishene Bay Purchase (1798), the Lake Simcoe–Lake Huron Purchase (1815) and the South Simcoe Purchase (1818). In 1828 the Chippewas numbered approximately "550 souls" under the leadership of "Chief Yellow Head"—the same "Musquakie or Yellow Head, Chief of the Rein Deer Tribe", who was involved in the Lake Simcoe-Lake Huron Purchase and the South Simcoe Purchase. They still occupied their remaining lands about Lake Simcoe and the Holland River, and reportedly had "expressed a strong desire to be admitted to Christianity, and to adopt the habits of civilized life".

In 1830, Musquakie/Yellowhead and his people were induced by agents of Lieutenant Governor John Colborne to settle in two purpose-built villages, one at the Atherley Narrows between Lakes Simcoe and Couchiching, and the other at Coldwater, between which they cleared a road on his instructions. Colborne began paying the Chippewas an annuity and identified "three islands set apart for them", but it was his hope that they would soon take to farming, the village of Orillia having been established by white settlers brought there to teach them European farming techniques. In a surviving letter to Colborne dated September 1830, Yellowhead and four other leaders spoke of their gladness at receiving "the money you sent us" for clearing the road, asking however "when you can pay us the remainder". Just six years later, Lieutenant Governor Francis Bond Head persuaded the Chippewas to give up this country "[rather] than to continue [living] on it, surrounded as it was by the White Population, and consequently deprived as it was of its Game". Musquakie/Yellowhead and his chiefs afterwards objected to this Simcoe-Coldwater Purchase, writing to Governor General Charles Bagot in 1842 that "we were not made sensible of the full purport" of the deal, which paid them only one-third of the proceeds of the sale, and complaining that "we have not received any money from the sale of the said Land". Bond Head had hidden from the Chippewas his intention to sell the land, lot by lot, to white settlers and to forward the proceeds to them as they were generated. Their petition of 1842 received a sympathetic hearing: as they had asked, the proceeds of the piecemeal sales of their former land were banked, and the Chippewas received an annual income from the interest.

As a consequence of the Simcoe-Coldwater Purchase, the Chippewas had to abandon the villages built for them by Colborne in 1830. The Coldwater band relocated to Beausoleil Island in Georgian Bay, whereas, in 1838, the main band at the Atherley Narrows relocated to Rama, where they had obtained 1600 acres of land "purchased out of their own funds" at a cost of $3200. The population of the new settlement was calculated in 1858 to be 201 persons, and its inhabitants' annual revenue from land purchases was $1894.21. Notwithstanding this income, a government report of 1858 commented on the "lamentable" conditions of life among the Chippewas of Rama, observing that, owing to government neglect, "the log houses built for them ... being badly constructed, are all going to decay", that farming was not being taken up, and that the residents "are dragging through a life disgraceful to humanity". Indebtedness to white traders accounts for some of the settlement's early economic woes. In 1839, Musquakie/Yellowhead and two of his chiefs wrote to the Indian Department, that, as soon as Rama was up and running, they intended "to go and hunt in order to pay our debts to those we have been so long owing".

Musquakie/Yellowhead, also known as William Yellowhead, died on 11 January 1864. In his will, which the government declared invalid, he appointed his nephew Isaac Yellowhead to succeed him as "Head Chief of the Chippewa tribe of Indians", but it was Joseph B. Naingishkung who succeeded him.

Governance
The First Nation's leadership consists of a chief and six councillors, elected under the Indian Act Electoral System put into place in the 1930s by Canada in the attempt to depose hereditary chiefs and headman as leaders. The current elected leadership (2014-2016) is Chief Rodney Noganosh and Councillors Ronald Douglas, Ted Williams, Tracey Snache, Nemke Quarrington,  and Gina Genno. A by-election held in January 2015 elected a sixth councillor, Ted Snache.   The First Nation is a member of Ogemawahj Tribal Council, a regional Chiefs' council, and in June 2016 rejoined the Union of Ontario Indians/Anishinabek Nation. Rama is also a part of the  Chippewa Tri-Council which consists of Beausoleil First Nation and the Chippewas of Georgina Island as well as descendants in Neywash (Huron-Robinson Treaty). The Chippewa Tri-Council were once one reserve, the Coldwater Narrows Reserve established in 1830, under one principal chief, Chief Yellowhead. Further, before The Coldwater Narrows Reserve was established this group was the Chippewas of Lake Simcoe and Huron.

Notable citizens 
 James Bartleman, diplomat and author
 Chief Lady Bird (b. 1993), muralist and illustrator
 Glenna Matoush (b. 1946), visual artist
 Arthur Shilling (b. 1941), painter
 Neebinnaukzhik Southall (b. 1989), illustrator and advocate

See also 
 Casino Rama
 Rama, Ontario
 Mnjikaning Fish Weirs

References

External links
 Chippewas of Rama First Nation
 History of Mnjikaning First Nation
 AANDC profile
 Information on the Coldwater Narrows Land claim
 Casino Rama
 About the art in Casino Rama

Communities in Simcoe County